Aquinas College is a private Roman Catholic college in Nashville, Tennessee. It was founded in 1961 and named in honor of St. Thomas Aquinas.

History
Aquinas College is a private four-year college founded in 1961, owned and operated by the Dominican Sisters of St. Cecilia Congregation in Nashville, Tennessee. It offers undergraduate degrees in education, English, and history, as well as graduate degrees in education.

Aquinas College roots began in 1928 as St. Cecilia Normal School as a school for religious sisters located at the St. Cecilia Motherhouse. In 1961, the school moved away from the Motherhouse, opened to the public, and became Aquinas Junior College. In 1994, the college was renamed Aquinas College when it began offering four-year degrees. Since that time, Aquinas College has grown to include four-year programs in Liberal Arts, Business, Nursing, and Teacher Education. And in 2012, the college began graduate studies in the School of Education and in the School of Nursing, and founded a residential life program and House Life program. Aquinas is part of the Dominican Campus, located approximately five miles (8 km) west of downtown Nashville. Also on the same plot of land are Overbrook School, a coeducational eight-grade Catholic primary school, and Saint Cecilia Academy, a Catholic girls' high school.

The addition of a third and fourth year collegiate curriculum caused a major change in the school's operation. It had previously been a major power in junior college athletics (notably baseball and basketball). However, the school's administration felt that continuing to play junior college athletics while operating as a four-year college, as was done for a period, misrepresented the school's true nature to the public and that competition at the four-year collegiate level of athletics would prove cost-prohibitive, so the institution currently sponsors no athletic programs.

In 2014, Aquinas College began the implementation of its Vision 2020: Truth & Charity strategic plan, which included the reintroduction of intercollegiate athletics. The college promptly implemented three initiatives outlined in the strategic plan: the foundation of a perpetual Eucharistic Adoration chapel, the foundation of study abroad in Bracciano, Italy, and the implementation of a four-year Bachelor of Science in Nursing (BSN) program.

The founding of Aquinas College in 1961 was the realization of a long-held dream of the Dominican Sisters of St. Cecilia of Nashville, Tennessee: to have a place where the newest members of the religious community could receive their initial degrees to serve in the community's teaching apostolate. Over the years, this fundamental mission has remained, even as the sisters have continually found ways to be of service to the educational and catechetical needs of the Nashville community and beyond.

In 2017, Aquinas College embarked on a path of reconfiguration in order to focus its academic programming on preparation of educators and to strengthen its service to Catholic school teachers, leaders, and catechists through spiritual and professional formation programs. In 2019 Aquinas College released and began implementation of Sent to Witness: Aquinas College Strategic Plan 2019–2025, in support of the sharp focus on education.

The Center for Catholic Education at Aquinas College in conjunction with the School of Education serves Catholic elementary and secondary schools by providing spiritual and professional formation opportunities in the area of mission and Catholic identity.

The Center for Evangelization and Catechesis at Aquinas College supports the work of catechists and leaders by providing workshops, retreats, and directed study of the Catholic Faith.

Rankings
The U.S. News & World Report has ranked Aquinas College as 14th in Best Regional Colleges in the South in its 2015 rankings, up from a ranking of 30th in the previous year. Contributing to the high ranking were the low class sizes and student-to-faculty ratio, high freshman retention rate, high test scores, a high graduation rate, and a high peer assessment score. The magazine also recognized Aquinas College for being fourth in Best Colleges for veterans in the same regional college category, up from seventh in the previous year.

References

External links
 Official website

1928 establishments in Tennessee
Association of Catholic Colleges and Universities
Dominican universities and colleges in the United States
Educational institutions established in 1928
Roman Catholic Diocese of Nashville
Catholic universities and colleges in Tennessee
Universities and colleges accredited by the Southern Association of Colleges and Schools
Universities and colleges in Nashville, Tennessee